Sofia Inguanta (born 19 April 1993) is a footballer who plays as a forward for Karlsruher SC. Born in Germany, she represents Greece at international level.

Career
Inguanta has been capped for the Greece national team, appearing for the team during the 2019 FIFA Women's World Cup qualifying cycle.

She joined Frauen-Bundesliga club Werder Bremen in January 2019 from PSV. She scored three goals in four league matches before sustaining a cruciate ligament tear in March, ending her season.

References

External links
 
 

1993 births
Living people
Sportspeople from Oberhausen
German people of Greek descent
Citizens of Greece through descent
Sportspeople of Greek descent
Greek women's footballers
Footballers from North Rhine-Westphalia
German women's footballers
Women's association football forwards
Greece women's international footballers
Germany women's youth international footballers
Frauen-Bundesliga players
SGS Essen players
SC 07 Bad Neuenahr players
MSV Duisburg (women) players

SV Werder Bremen (women) players

Greek expatriate women's footballers
German expatriate women's footballers
German expatriate sportspeople in the Netherlands
Greek expatriate sportspeople in the Netherlands
Expatriate women's footballers in the Netherlands